The 1939 Brown Bears football team represented Brown University as an independent during the 1939 college football season. Led by 14th-year head coach Tuss McLaughry, the Bears compiled a record of 5–3–1.

Schedule

References

Brown
Brown Bears football seasons
Brown Bears football